16th Century Russian Wedding is a 1909 Russian short drama film directed and written by Vasili Goncharov.

Plot 

The young boyar accidentally overturns the cart, which goes to meet him. There was a hawk who was not hurt. After parting with her, he comes home, where his parents want him to marry a girl whom he should not see before the wedding. After the wedding, the bride takes off the veil and the boyar finds out the stranger with whom fate brought him on the road.

Starring 
 Aleksandra Goncharova as Bride
 Vasili Stepanov as Bride's Father
 Andrey Gromov as Groom
 Lidiya Tridenskaya as Groom's Mother
 Pyotr Chardynin as Groom's Father
 Pavel Biryukov as P. Biryukov 
 Ivan Kamsky
 Ivan Potemkin  
 Antonina Pozharskaya as A. Pozharskaya

References

External links 
 

1909 films
1900s Russian-language films
Russian silent short films
Films set in the 16th century
Films of the Russian Empire
Russian black-and-white films
Films directed by Vasily Goncharov
Russian drama films
1909 drama films
1909 short films
Silent drama films